Joseph Marion Hernández (May 26, 1788 – June 8, 1857) was an American planter, politician and military officer. He was the first  from the Florida Territory and the first Hispanic American to serve in the United States Congress. A member of the Whig Party, he served from September 1822 to March 1823.

Biography 
José Mariano Hernández was born in St. Augustine, Florida during Florida's second Spanish period. His parents were Minorcans who had originally come to the region as indentured servants in Andrew Turnbull's New Smyrna colony. Prior to the American acquisition of Florida, Hernández owned three plantations south of St. Augustine (in what was then East Florida): San Jose, Mala Compra, and Bella Vista.

He married the widowed Ana María Hill Williams on February 25, 1814, in St. Augustine. Ana María Hill was born on June 6, 1787, in St. Augustine, and was the daughter of the South Carolinian merchant Theophilus Hill, and his wife Theresa Thomas. The Hills had immigrated from South Carolina by the 1780s, Hernández and his wife had at least one child, Dora Hernández.  

When Spain ceded the Floridas to the United States in the Adams–Onís Treaty in 1819, Hernández pledged his allegiance to the U.S. After the organization of the Florida Territory, he was elected Florida's first  to the United States House of Representatives, and was approved by President James Monroe on September 30, 1822. He thus became the first Hispanic ever to serve in the U.S. Congress. He served for six months, leaving office on March 3, 1823.

Hernández later served in the Territorial House of Representatives, the predecessor to the Florida House of Representatives, in which he was the presiding officer. He continued running his plantations, which were burned by the Seminoles in the Second Seminole War. The ruins of one of these plantations, Mala Compra, is today a preserved archaeological site. He was appointed Brigadier General over a troop of volunteers from the Mosquito Roarers militia during the war and was subsequently commissioned in the United States Army, serving from 1835 to 1838. Hernández was the commanding officer responsible for the imprisonment of the Seminole leader Osceola upon the orders of General Thomas Jesup, as well as the capture of Seminole chiefs Ee-mat-la (King Philip) and Seminole ally Uchee Billy. He retired with the rank of Brigadier General.

Hernández was an unsuccessful Whig candidate for the United States Senate in 1845. He later moved to Cuba and engaged as a planter in the District of Coliseo, near Matanzas, and died at the family's sugar estate, "Audaz", in the District of Coliseo, in Matanzas Province. He is interred in the Del Junco family vault in Necropolis San Carlos Borromeo, Matanzas.

Hernández–Capron Trail 

In 1837, while with the U.S. Army, Hernández was ordered to build a road between St. Augustine, Florida and Fort Capron, located near present-day Fort Pierce, Florida, on the St. Lucie River. He directed the blazing and clearing of the route that, 12 years earlier, Col. James Gadsden had cleared along the Atlantic Coastal Ridge to the St. Lucie River. It passed from Fort Capron through Fort Vinton, Fort Drum, Fort Kissimmee, Fort Meade to Fort Brooke (Tampa).

See also 
 List of Hispanic Americans in the United States Congress

References

External links
 Various articles, 2 on Hernandez-Capron Trail
 Friends of the Enchanted Forest Sanctuary - History Article
 Enchanted Forest Sanctuary - Official Homepage
 Florida Historical Marker SR 520 and US 1
 
 P.K. Yonge Historical Collection at the University of Florida, Gainesville

1788 births
1857 deaths
Florida Whigs
19th-century American politicians
American people of Spanish descent
Hispanic and Latino American slave owners
Hispanic and Latino American members of the United States Congress
People of Spanish Florida
People from St. Augustine, Florida
Delegates to the United States House of Representatives from Florida Territory
Cuban planters
United States Army generals
American military personnel of the Indian Wars
American planters